Angeliki Frangou (born 1965) is a Greek shipowner. She is the chairman, chief executive officer and Director of Navios Maritime Holdings., of Navios Maritime Partners L.P., of Navios Tankers Management Inc. and Navios Maritime Acquisition Corporation.

Early life and education
Frangou was born in Chios island in northern Aegean, coming from a family of shipowners from the village of Kardamyla. Her father is the shipowner Nikolaos (Nikolas) Frangos. She has a brother Ioannis (John), and two younger sisters (Katerina) and (Maria) . Her brother is also a shipowner with his own company and both them are the fourth generation of shipowners in the family.

Frangou obtained a bachelor's degree in mechanical engineering from Fairleigh Dickinson University and a master's degree in mechanical engineering from Columbia University.

Navios Group
In 2004, Frangou raised $200 million to buy Navios. Previously she was working on Wall St as an analyst on the trading floor of Republic National Bank for a couple of years. As of December 2014, Navios Group controls 149 dry bulk carriers, 50 tankers and 12 container vessels. Between 2004- 2014, "the Navios group has raised a shade under $10bn in financing - $6.3bn from the capital markets and 3.6bn from bank debt". Angeliki Frangou demonstrates an acute ability to grasp both the financial and shipping markets. "She is just as happy to mull over the fuel economies that can be achieved by proper sandblasting as she is to discuss the intricacies of financial tools". Asked about the role of women in top posts in shipping, she retorted that "I don't believe in gender, race, religion. I think it's what you want to make it. If you ever thought that you work in a company for any other reason than your ability, you should leave!"

Awards & mentions
In 2014 Frangou was listed 11th in the Lloyd's List Top 100 Most Influential People in Shipping list. In 2013, Frangou was mentioned on CNN's International Leading Women. In 2011, she was named the 50th most powerful businesswoman in Fortune Magazine. Also, she was named as Connecticut Maritime Association's Commodore for the year 2011.

Personal life 
Frangou has one son named Nikolas, which was christened in Kardamyla and a daughter named Stella who was christened in Kifissia. She loves the opera and likes to collect Greek, Byzantine and Chinese artwork.

References

External links
 Angeliki Frangou Company bio 
 Navios Maritime Partners L.P.
 Navios Tankers Management Inc.
 Navios Maritime Acquisition Corporation
 Navios Maritime Holdings

1965 births
Greek women in business
Columbia School of Engineering and Applied Science alumni
Living people
Fairleigh Dickinson University alumni
Women chief executives
Greek chief executives
Greek businesspeople in shipping
Businesspeople from Chios